United! is a 1973 children's novel by prolific British author Michael Hardcastle. It is the second in a series of books focusing on the fortunes of fictitious youth football team Bank Vale United.

Plot summary
United! follows youth football team Bank Vale United's attempts to improve their fortunes by buying a player from a rival team. Despite the fact that their team is amateur, United's impetuous striker Kevin Ripley believes there is no reason why they cannot pay for someone to come and join them. Kevin's teammates Keith Nash and Gary Ansell, although sceptical, agree to the plan and the boys manage to raise the princely sum of £1 to purchase the talents of Nick Abel-Smith.

Despite Nick's obvious ability he is an unsettling influence and the Bank Vale players have to make a tough choice between success and loyalty. In addition to the usual football action Hardcastle includes a section on another of his interests, Motocross.

References

1973 British novels
British children's novels
Novels about association football
1973 children's books
Methuen Publishing books